Sarany is an urban locality (an urban-type settlement) in Gornozavodsky District of Perm Krai, Russia. Population: 

Geologists are aware that Uvarovite was found there in the 20th century.

History 
The settlement arose in 1889 due to the discovery of a chromite deposit used in the chemical and ceramic industries. The extraction of chromites started in 1889. Over a century of mining, more than 10 million tonnes of chromite ore were produced.

The settlement has been an urban settlement since June 26, 1940.

References

Urban-type settlements in Perm Krai